Micula is a commune in Romania.

Micula may also refer to:

Micula (surname)
Micula River, an alternate name for the Egherul Mare River